Hèngjiàn (横涧乡) may refer to:

Hengjian Township, Hebei, in Jingxing Mining District, Shijiazhuang, Hebei, China
Hengjian Township, Shanxi, in Fanshi County, Shanxi, China
Hengjian Township, Henan, in Lushi County, Henan, China